Alex Fort Brescia is a Peruvian businessman. He is the co-chairman of Grupo Breca, a family conglomerate, and BBVA Continental, a Peruvian bank.

Early life
Alex Fort Brescia was born on October 16, 1957,  in Lima,  Peru  into the billionaire Brescia family. His Italian-born grandfather, Fortunato Brescia Tassano, founded Grupo Breca, a real estate company-turned-conglomerate. His mother, Rosa Brescia Cafferata, is a billionaire heiress. His brother, Bernardo Fort Brescia, is an architect.

Fort Brescia graduated from Williams College and earned a master in business administration from the Columbia Business School.

Career
Fort Brescia is the co-chairman of Grupo Breca, his family conglomerate. He is also the chairman of BBVA Continental, a Peruvian bank. Additionally, he is the chairman of the insurance company Rímac Seguros, as well as B1 Capital Partners and Melon. He serves on the boards of directors of Tasa, Minsur, Intursa, CPPQ, Exsa and Urbanova.

Additionally, he is a member of the Board of Directors of APORTA, a social impact entity of Grupo Breca.

References

Living people
Peruvian people of Italian descent
Williams College alumni
Columbia Business School alumni
Peruvian businesspeople
Peruvian corporate directors
Peruvian bankers
Brescia family
Year of birth missing (living people)